Punyashlok Ahilyadevi Holkar Solapur University is a state university located in Solapur, Maharashtra, India. Formerly it was postgraduate centre of Shivaji University. Punyashlok Ahilyadevi Holkar Solapur University was established on 1 August 2004 and was inaugurated on 3 August 2004 by the Governor of Maharashtra. The formation of the university at Solapur was a long cherished desire of the people of this region. Earlier, to the formation of Punyashlok Ahilyadevi Holkar University, Solapur had a P.G. Centre of for over two decades. The centre for P.G. studies had three postgraduate science departments and 7 postgraduate courses conducted in the P.G. departments. With this sound background has been established to cater the needs of over 60,000 students community. The university is poised for an ambitious growth. The University is now a hub of various academic activities. Good number of Engineering, Agricultural, Architectural, Medical and Traditional institutions of national fame are located in and around the city. Solapur is a home of religious saints of various languages as the district is at a triple junction of linguistic states of Andhra, Karnataka. Therefore, Solapur is secular and metropolitan to its core. The said backdrop makes the University stands for transcendent principles and embodying noble mission. It is a small team yet progressive and forward-looking. Perched on a plateau, the is a citadel of higher learning. Recently the university has introduced the concept of school system and has decided to bring its various departments under umbrella of various schools, viz.

Affiliated colleges
Its jurisdiction extends over Solapur.

Punyashlok Ahilyadevi Holkar Solapur University Schools/Departments
Departments/Schools in the University.
 School of Chemical Sciences
 School of Computational Sciences
 School of Earth Science
 School of Physical Sciences 
 School of Social Science 
 School of Education 
 School of Commerce and Management

Punyashlok Ahilyadevi Holkar Solapur University Vice-Chancellors & Acting Vice-Chancellors
List of Vice-Chancellors of Punyashlok Ahilyadevi Holkar Solapur University.
 I. S. Swami (Vice Chancellor) (2004–2007)
 N. N. Maldar (Acting Vice Chancellor) (Sept 2007 – Nov 2007)
 B. P. Bandgar (Vice Chancellor) (2007–2012)
 N. J. Pawar (Acting Vice Chancellor) (Nov 2012 – Dec 2012)
 N. N. Maldar (Vice Chancellor) (2012–2017)
 Nitin Karmalkar (Acting Vice Chancellor) (Dec 2017 – May 2018)
 M. M. Fadnavis ( Vice Chancellor ) (May 2018 to till date)

See also
List of higher education institutions in Maharashtra

Punyashlok Ahilyadevi Holkar Solapur University References

External links
 Official website

Universities in Maharashtra
Education in Solapur
Solapur
2004 establishments in Maharashtra